The  Yangbay bent-toed gecko (Cyrtodactylus yangbayensis) is a species of gecko found in Khánh Hòa Province, Vietnam.

Description

Distribution
The gecko is found in monsoon evergreen forests of Truong Son Mountain Range Khanh Hoa province, Vietnam.

References

Further reading
Ziegler, Thomas, and Q. T. Nguyen. "New discoveries of amphibians and reptiles from Vietnam." Bonn Zool. Bull 57.2 (2010): 137–147.

External links
Reptile Database

Cyrtodactylus
Reptiles of Vietnam
Reptiles described in 2010